Sonchus wightianus is an Asian species of plants in the tribe Cichorieae within the family Asteraceae. It is widespread across much of Asia, found in China, the Indian Subcontinent, and Southeast Asia as far south as Indonesia.

Sonchus wightianus is a perennial herb up to 150 cm tall. Stems and the bracts around the flower heads have many purple hairs. The plant produces flat-topped arrays of several flower heads, each head with 180-300 yellow ray flowers but no disc flowers.

References

External links
Medicinal Plants of Bangladesh
 constituents of Sonchus wightianus of Nepalese origin 
Flowers of India photos

wightianus
Flora of Asia
Indomalayan realm flora
Plants described in 1838
Taxa named by Augustin Pyramus de Candolle